

S

T

U

V

W

Y